Javier Zuluaga is a former professional American football player and current coach for Arizona College Prep (High School).

High school
Zuluaga attended Roncalli High School located in Indianapolis, Indiana. He was a Co-Captain his senior year and helped lead his team to the 1988 3A State Championship.

College
Javier attended United States Naval Academy. He became the 2nd All-Time Leading Tackler in school history. He was Co-Captain from 1990 to 1993.Zuluaga was known for his hard hitting. During the 1991 season against William and Mary, Javier tackled W&M's quarterback Chris Hakel causing the a bar of the face mask to get to stuck to Hakel's. In 1993, he had 17 tackles against Air Force, Navy won the game 28-24 ending an 11-year losing streak. Javier as well as 26 other midshipmen were involved in a 1992 cheating scandal on an electrical-engineering exam. A copy of the test was found the night before and was given out to many of the students. He was later expelled from the school but not due to cheating but for refusing to identify the people who were responsible.

Professional career
In 1994, he tried out for the Indianapolis Colts, however he was cut the same year. On May 17, 1994, he was signed by the Tampa Bay Storm of the Arena Football League, he was later released  August 6, 1994.

Post career
Zuluaga lives in Tempe, Arizona and runs a Home Repairs and Remodeling company. In 1995, he was the Co-Defensive Coordinator for Beddingfield High School in Wilson, North Carolina. From 2001 to 2003 he was player/coach for the Chandler Cobras of the Arizona Football League.

References

Indianapolis Colts players
Tampa Bay Storm players
Navy Midshipmen football players